The 2011–12 Season was Portsmouth's second season in The Championship after they were relegated from the Premier League during the 2009–10 season.

Players

First-team squad

For reserves and academy, see Portsmouth F.C. Reserves and Academy

Transfers 
Portsmouth have confirmed that any contracts due to expire at the end of the 2010–11 season would not be renewed due to their financial problems, and will release ten players.

To make things worse, the number of first-team players reduced, with Nadir Çiftçi transferring to Kayserispor.

On 1 June 2011 the club announced that it had been bought by Convers Sports Initiatives (CSI).

After the club takeout, new signings arrived on Fratton Park. David Norris arrived on a free transfer from Ipswich Town; Jason Pearce came from Bournemouth; Luke Varney, from Derby County; Stephen Henderson, from Bristol City and Greg Halford, from Wolverhampton Wanderers.

On 13 August, prior to kick-off against Brighton at Fratton Park, it was announced, much to the delight of the home fans, that Portsmouth had re-signed forward Benjani Mwaruwari, who previously left the club in 2008. On 14 October, Steve Cotterill agreed a compensation package to be allowed to take the vacant Nottingham Forest manager's position. Later that day, it was announced that first team coaches Stuart Gray and Guy Whittingham would take over management duties, Cotterill's departure allowed several omitted players a return to the first team, such as Dave Kitson and Ricardo Rocha in a 2–0 home win against Barnsley.

Following Cotterill's departure, Michael Appleton was announced as the new manager on 10 November 2011. His first match in charge was a 2–0 defeat at Watford, only Appleton's second match as a first team manager after taking charge of a single match during a spell as caretaker manager of West Bromwich Albion.

On 23 November 2011, a Europe-wide arrest warrant was issued for Portsmouth owner, Vladimir Antonov, by Lithuanian prosecutors as part of an investigation into alleged asset stripping at Lithuanian bank Bankas Snoras, which is 68% owned by Antonov and went into temporary administration the previous week. Operations in another of Antonov's banks, Latvijas Krajbanka were suspended by Latvian authorities on 22 November 2011 for similar reasons. Antonov was subsequently arrested at his offices in London on 24 November and has been bailed.

CSI released a statement which said "In the light of the recent events at Snoras Bank, Convers Sports Initiatives (CSI) would like to reassure its companies, staff, and the fans of its teams and events, that it remains very much business as usual." The statement added that "CSI has been solely financed through the private wealth of its owners. Snoras Bank has never provided funding for the purchase of a CSI organisation, nor has it lent any money to these businesses after they have been acquired." However, Lithuanian prosecutors added that they would be taking "all the necessary steps" to freeze assets belonging to Mr Antonov and his business partner. On 29 November, Antonov resigned as chairman of Portsmouth after parent company Convers Sports Initiatives entered administration.

On 24 January Portsmouth FC were issued with a winding up petition by HMRC for over 1.6 million in unpaid taxes, this petition will be heard on 20 February 2012. The lack of potential suitors has led to the fear that the club could fold becoming a reality. Those previously linked with investing in the club including Irishman Tony McSweeney and Peter Storrie have so far not submitted any interest and the other potential investor Joseph Cala has withdrawn his interest.

In 

Total spending:  £2,650,000

Out 

Total gaining:  £500,000

Key events
15 June: David Norris signed a three-year deal with the club.
24 June: Portsmouth buy Jason Pearce in an undisclosed fee.
13 August: Portsmouth resigns Benjani Mwaruwari.
14 October: Steve Cotterill leaves Portsmouth to manage Nottingham Forest.
10 November: Portsmouth announces Michael Appleton as the club's new manager.
23 November: A Europe-wide arrest warrant is issued for Portsmouth owner, Vladimir Antonov, with an asset stripping allegation.
24 November: Antonov is arrested at his offices in London.
29 November: Antonov resigns as Portsmouth chairman.
24 January: Portsmouth FC is issued with a winding up petition by HMRC for over £1.6m in unpaid taxes.
4 April: Spokesman Scott Mclachlan says that needs more than £8m to buy Portsmouth.
11 April: Portsmouth administrator Trevor Birch announces that no offers have been made to buy the club.
21 April: Portsmouth is relegated after a 1–2 home defeat against Derby County.
28 April: After the last game of the season, Portsmouth manager Michael Appleton says that "17 or 18 players could be leaving the club and the same number coming in" in this summer.

Player statistics

Squad stats 

|-
|colspan="14"|Players who have left the club after the start of the season:

|}

Top scorers
Updated on 22 April

Disciplinary record
Updated on 28 April

Competition

The Championship

Results summary

Results by round

Competitive

Pre-season

Championship

Football League Cup

FA Cup

References

External links 
Official Website

Portsmouth F.C. seasons
Portsmouth